Puerto Rico Highway 3 (PR-3) at nearly 100 miles long, is the second-longest highway on Puerto Rico (after PR-2). It connects the San Juan neighborhood of Río Piedras to downtown Salinas indirectly around the eastern coast of the island. Highway 3 ranges from a three lane urban avenue in San Juan to a one lane rural road past Fajardo. While other roads connect San Juan, it runs the coastline of Puerto Rico east of San Juan, beginning in Río Piedras near Santurce (where it is known as the Avenida 65 de Infantería) and goes to Fajardo where it goes south paralleling the coastline to Humacao and Maunabo. It goes up to a mountain-scenic route and goes west to Salinas, where it meets PR-1.

Route description

San Juan to Río Grande
PR-3 begins at an intersection with PR-1 in San Juan as the three lane 65th Infantry Regiment Avenue. Heading east through San Juan, Highway 3 functions as an urban boulevard with both at-grade and grade-separated intersections becoming decidedly suburban in character past the PR-26/66 overpass near downtown Carolina. Recently, PR-66 was opened and it has controlled the high traffic on PR-3.

Río Grande to Fajardo
It is a divided highway to Fajardo, and the only main highway connecting Fajardo to Río Grande. In Fajardo, PR-53 begins and PR-3 becomes a one-lane per direction rural road, and keeps that way for the rest of its length, though there are some minor divided segments in Humacao near Junquito, a very small segment near Patagonia (close to its intersection with PR-30) and another segment in Arroyo and Guayama for about nearly 10 kilometers.

Municipalities served
The following are the municipalities through which PR-3 passes:

 San Juan
 Carolina
 Canóvanas
 Loíza
 Río Grande
 Luquillo
 Fajardo
 Ceiba
 Naguabo
 Humacao
 Yabucoa
 Maunabo
 Patillas
 Arroyo
 Guayama
 Salinas

Loíza is the only coastal municipality not served by PR-3 in its length through the east shore until its intersection with PR-1 in Salinas. PR-188 serves as the main artery from the highway to Loíza. The remaining coasts of Puerto Rico (west of San Juan and west of Salinas) are served by PR-1 (West Salinas, Santa Isabel, Juana Díaz and East Ponce) and PR-2 (the rest of the coastline though some municipalities are not directly served). In Maunabo and south Yabucoa, PR-3 is not the main "at-grade" artery since it goes up in the mountains. PR-901 is the main at grade road in this segment of about 10 kilometers.

Puerto Rico Highway 53

Just like PR-22 parallels PR-2 and PR-52 parallels PR-1, PR-53 is the toll highway which parallels PR-3 and they have several exit intersections. Yet, PR-53 has not been completed and PR-3 serves as the main road in the southeastern part of Puerto Rico going from Yabucoa to Guayama, though PR-901 serves as a primary road (because it is shorter through it) between Yabucoa and Maunabo.

Major intersections

Related route

Puerto Rico Highway 3R (abbreviated Ramal PR-3 or PR-3R) is a bypass near downtown Humacao, Puerto Rico. This road is part of Nicanor Vázquez Boulevard.

See also

 Interstate Highways in Puerto Rico
 List of highways numbered 3

References

External links

 Bajo el puente Julia de Burgos

003
3